Normandel is a former commune in the Orne department in north-western France. On 1 January 2018, it was merged into the new commune of Charencey. It was the birthplace of Jacques Goulet (1615-1688), ancestor of virtually all Goulets in North America.

See also
Communes of the Orne department

References

Former communes of Orne